Viratnagar previously known as Bairat or Bairath is a town in northern Jaipur district of Rajasthan, India.

History

Ancient era

According to Huen Tsang, visitor to China, Tonk was under Bairath State or Viratnagar previously known as Bairat or Bairath.

The present-day site of Bairat corresponds to the ancient city of Virāṭanagara, which was the capital of the Iron Age Matsya kingdom (c. 1400-c. 350 BC), which was one of the solasa (sixteen) Mahajanapadas (great kingdoms) according to the 6th BCE Buddhist text Anguttara Nikaya. Matsya kingdom had Kuru and Surasena mahajanapadas to its north and east respectively.

Medieval era

Bairat was a part of the Mauryan Empire. The ruins of the Bijak-ki-pahadi (Bairat Temple), a Buddhist Chaitya (chapel) from the 3rd century BCE located in Bairat, are the oldest free-standing Buddhist structures in India. The town is also home to ruins of a Buddhist monastery, a wood and timber shrine, and two rock-cut edicts (Bairat Edict and Bhabru Edict) from Emperor Ashoka; these date from the Mauryan period (circa 250 BCE). However, Akhnoor, a town in the union territory of Jammu and Kashmir is also considered by many as the ancient Virat Nagar.

Early modern era

The town has a number of Mughal structures, including a Chhatri (cenotaph) with some of the earliest surviving murals in Rajasthan, and a lodge where the Mughal emperor Akbar hunted and stayed overnight on his yearly pilgrimage to Ajmer.

Maharao Bada Singh Meena was the ruler at the time of Akbar.

Geography

References

Cities and towns in Jaipur district
History of Rajasthan